Periodic Steady-State Analysis (PSS analysis) computes the periodic steady-state response of a circuit at a specified fundamental frequency, with a simulation time independent of the time constants of the circuit. The PSS analysis also determines the circuit's periodic operating point which is required starting point for the periodic time-varying small-signal analyses: PAC, PSP, PXF, and Pnoise. The PSS analysis works with both autonomous and driven circuits.
PSS is usually used after transient analysis.

Examples 
For this component operating in a periodic steady state circuit, its voltage will be  when T is equal to its fundamental period. Referring back to the original voltage function , it can be determined that the average current flowing through the capacitor is zero in periodic steady state.
Electricity